On a differentiable manifold, the exterior derivative extends the concept of the differential of a function to differential forms of higher degree. The exterior derivative was first described in its current form by Élie Cartan in 1899. The resulting calculus, known as exterior calculus, allows for a natural, metric-independent generalization of Stokes' theorem, Gauss's theorem, and Green's theorem from vector calculus.

If a differential -form is thought of as measuring the flux through an infinitesimal -parallelotope at each point of the manifold, then its exterior derivative can be thought of as measuring the net flux through the boundary of a -parallelotope at each point.

Definition 
The exterior derivative of a differential form of degree  (also differential -form, or just -form for brevity here) is a differential form of degree .

The exterior product of differential forms (denoted with the same symbol ) is defined as their pointwise exterior product.

There are a variety of equivalent definitions of the exterior derivative of a general -form.

In terms of axioms
The exterior derivative is defined to be the unique -linear mapping from -forms to -forms that has the following properties:

  for a -form .
  where  is a -form. That is to say,  is an antiderivation of degree  on the exterior algebra of differential forms.

The second defining property holds in more generality:  for any -form ; more succinctly, .

In terms of local coordinates
Alternatively, one can work entirely in a local coordinate system . The coordinate differentials  form a basis of the space of one-forms, each associated with a coordinate.

(using the Einstein summation convention).  The definition of the exterior derivative is extended linearly to a general -form

Note that whenever  equals one of the components of the multi-index  then  (see Exterior product).

The definition of the exterior derivative in local coordinates follows from the preceding definition in terms of axioms. Indeed, with the -form  as defined above,

Here, we have interpreted  as a -form, and then applied the properties of the exterior derivative.

This result extends directly to the general -form  as

Most current authors have the convention that 

while in older text like Kobayashi and Nomizu or Helgason

In terms of invariant formula
Alternatively, an explicit formula can be given for the exterior derivative of a -form , when paired with  arbitrary smooth vector fields :

where  denotes the Lie bracket and a hat denotes the omission of that element:

In particular, when  is a -form we have that .

Note: With the conventions of e.g., Kobayashi–Nomizu and Helgason the formula differs by a factor of :

Examples 
Example 1. Consider  over a -form basis  for a scalar field . The exterior derivative is:

Namely, .

Example 2. By applying the above formula to each term (consider  and ) we have the following sum,

Stokes' theorem on manifolds 

Further properties

Closed and exact forms

Because , every exact form is closed. The Poincaré lemma states that in a contractible region, the converse is true.

de Rham cohomology
Because the exterior derivative  has the property that , it can be used as the differential (coboundary) to define de Rham cohomology on a manifold. The theorem of de Rham shows that this map is actually an isomorphism, a far-reaching generalization of the Poincaré lemma. As suggested by the generalized Stokes' theorem, the exterior derivative is the "dual" of the boundary map on singular simplices.

Naturality

Exterior derivative in vector calculus 
Most vector calculus operators are special cases of, or have close relationships to, the notion of exterior differentiation.

Gradient
A smooth function  on a real differentiable manifold  is a -form. The exterior derivative of this -form is the -form .

That is,

where  denotes the musical isomorphism  mentioned earlier that is induced by the inner product.

Divergence
A vector field  on  has a corresponding -form

where  denotes the omission of that element.

The exterior derivative of this -form is the -form

Curl
A vector field  on  also has a corresponding -form

The integral of  along a path is the work done against  along that path.

When , in three-dimensional space, the exterior derivative of the -form  is the -form

Invariant formulations of operators in vector calculus
The standard vector calculus operators can be generalized for any pseudo-Riemannian manifold, and written in coordinate-free notation as follows:

See also 

Exterior covariant derivative
de Rham complex
Finite element exterior calculus
Discrete exterior calculus
Green's theorem
Lie derivative
Stokes' theorem
Fractal derivative

Notes

References

External links 
 Archived at Ghostarchive and the Wayback Machine: 

Differential forms
Differential operators
Generalizations of the derivative